Salach is a municipality in the district of Göppingen in Baden-Württemberg in southern Germany.

History
In 1806, Salach, previously a possession of the Lordship of Staufeneck, was mediatized to the Kingdom of Württemberg. Oberamt Göppingen was reorganized in 1938 as Landkreis Göppingen, under whose jurisdiction Salach remained. The town began a period of urban growth after World War II, adding new areas to its northern and southern extremities.

Geography
The municipality (Gemeinde) of Salach is found in the district of Göppingen, in Baden-Württemberg, one of the 16 States of the Federal Republic of Germany. Elevation above sea level in the municipal area ranges from a high of  Normalnull (NN) to a low of  NN.

Politics
Salach has one borough (Ortsteil), Salach, and seven villages: Baierhof, Bärenbachhof, Bärenbach, Bärenhöfle, Kapfhöfe, Schafhof, and Staufeneck. The municipality of Salach is in a municipal association with the city of Eislingen and the municipality of Ottenbach.

Coat of arms
The municipal coat of arms for Salach displays a lion, in blue and facing to the left, upon a field of yellow. It was approved for official use, and a corresponding flag issued to the municipality, by the Federal Ministry of the Interior on 7 March 1960.

Transportation
Salach is connected to Germany's network of roadways by Bundesstraße 10 and to its railways by the Fils Valley Railway.

References

External links

  (in German)

Towns in Baden-Württemberg
Göppingen (district)